Michael Dunn (born Gary Neil Miller; October 20, 1934 – August 30, 1973) was an American actor and singer with dwarfism. He inspired a number of actors significantly smaller and shorter (those with dwarfism) than most people, including Zelda Rubinstein, Eric the Actor, and Mark Povinelli.

Medical condition
Dunn had medical dwarfism, a result of spondyloepiphyseal dysplasia (SED, subtype unknown), a genetic defect of cartilage production caused by a mutation in the COL2A1 (type II collagen) gene.  This disorder, classified as a skeletal dysplasia, causes distorted development of the limbs, spine, and ribcage and leads to early, widespread osteoarthritis and constricted lung growth. As an adult, Dunn stood 3' 10" and weighed about 78 pounds (117 cm, 35 kg). During Dunn's lifetime, his condition was described by the nonspecific term "progressive chondrodystrophy", or alternatively as "achondroplasia", a term that now refers specifically to a skeletal dysplasia caused by a defect in the gene for fibroblast growth factor receptor 3.

Early life
Dunn was born to Jewell (née Hilly; died 1990) and Fred Miller (died 1981) during the time of the Dust Bowl drought. He chose his stage name in order to differentiate himself from another Gary Miller in the Screen Actors Guild. ("Dunn" was his maternal grandmother's maiden name, but his reason for choosing "Michael" is unknown and not derived from his monastic experience in 1958.) An only child, when he was four years old, his family moved to Dearborn, Michigan.

Dunn started reading at age three, was champion of the 1947 Detroit News Spelling Bee—representing Wallaceville School in Wayne County—and showed early skill at the piano. He enjoyed singing from childhood, loved to draw an impromptu audience (even while waiting for a bus), and developed a pleasing lyric baritone and superb sight-reading skills. His parents defied pressure from school authorities to sequester him in a school for disabled children and staunchly supported his talents, independence, and integration into mainstream society. "I always got thrown out of classes for being too lippy", he commented about his experience with elementary school teachers. "I'd read more than they." His orthopedic condition greatly limited his mobility, but he swam and ice-skated in childhood and remained a skilled swimmer throughout his life.

Education
He attended Redford High School in Detroit (1947–1951), then entered University of Michigan in Ann Arbor in September 1951, just before his 17th birthday. However, according to his Columbia Studios press kit biography, his studies were interrupted when he was knocked down a flight of stairs during a "student rush", which resulted in a three-month hospital stay.

In 1953, he transferred to the University of Miami, College of Arts and Sciences, which offered a better climate and more accessible campus. His transcript shows that, despite scoring at the 97th percentile of ACE placement exams and the 99th percentile of the CTS English test, he did not distinguish himself academically. However, he was a high spirited and well-known figure about campus who sang in the talent show and facetiously joined the football cheerleading squad. Archives at that university's Otto G. Richter Library show that he became first a copyeditor and a contributing writer, then managing editor in 1954 of the college magazine, Tempo. (Contrary to information that later appeared in his Columbia Studios biography, Dunn could not take credit for Tempo winning the Sigma Delta Chi Award for best college magazine in the country, since credit went to the Editor-in-Chief.) His classmate John Softness recalled, "He could sing like an angel, and he could act and he could write and he was a brilliant raconteur." Softness ran a campus-wide advertising campaign called "Wheels for Gary," which brought in enough money from student donations to buy a used 1951 Austin outfitted with hand controls, so that Dunn could get around independently.

At various points, he held different odd jobs—singing in a nightclub, answering telephones for the  Miami Daily News, and working as a hotel detective. ("What a gaff!  I got my room free and all I did was play cards with the night clerk and keep an eye open for any funny business in the lobby. Who would ever suspect me of being a detective?") He left college in 1956 after completing only his sophomore year, returned to Michigan, and attended summer classes at the University of Detroit, in 1957.

Religion
Dunn converted to Catholicism and was baptized in 1954. He was living in Ann Arbor with his parents, working as a professional singer, at the time he entered St. Bonaventure Monastery in Detroit, on February 25, 1958. 

According to a Capuchin Provincial Archivist, Dunn entered with the intention of becoming a Capuchin non-ordained Brother. He was known by his given name, Gary, since he never became a novice. A testimonial from John F. Bradley, Catholic Chaplain, University of Michigan, states: "He has always been interested in Catholic activities and was president of the Newman Club in another school". In response to a question on the monastery application asking: "How long have you been thinking of entering religious life?" Dunn wrote, "More than three years." Dunn was later quoted in the New York Post explaining that he had wanted to be of service, since he was unfit for the military: "Everyone my age was going to Korea and I had this feeling that singing wasn't exactly doing my part." 

However, monastery records entered by the Master of Novices show that the physical demands of monastic life in a huge, 19th-century building with no elevator proved too strenuous. Dunn left of his own accord on May 8, 1958, to pursue a stage career in New York.

Career
In New York, Dunn re-encountered Softness, who volunteered to be his manager. He also befriended actress Phoebe Dorin in an off-Broadway show, Two by Saroyan, in which both had small parts in the early 1960s. They began singing together casually after their nighttime performances, sitting on the wall of the fountain opposite the Plaza Hotel, and drew a following. Eventually, on the advice of fellow actor Roddy McDowall, the pair started a nightclub act of songs mixed with conversational patter, titled "Michael Dunn and Phoebe". The act received favorable reviews in Time magazine and The New York Times and ultimately led directly to the pair being cast on The Wild Wild West television series, a Western spy spoof with elements of historical fiction and science fiction, which debuted in 1965.

Dunn was probably best known for his recurring role on that series as Dr. Miguelito Loveless, a mad scientist who devised passionately perverse schemes and gadgetry to ensnare Secret Service agents James West and Artemus Gordon (Robert Conrad and Ross Martin). (Note: Miguelito is the Spanish diminutive of Michael, equivalent to Mike or Mikey.) Dorin played Dr. Loveless's devoted assistant, Antoinette. In each episode in which they appeared together, the villainous couple tenderly sang a Victorian duet or two, heedless of the mayhem they had created around themselves. According to Dorin, Dunn saved her from drowning during filming of the episode "The Night of the Murderous Spring", plunging underwater to tear her free, when her costume became entangled in machinery used to sink a boat on the set. Dunn appeared as Dr Loveless 10 times on The Wild Wild West (four times apiece in the first two seasons and one time apiece in the remaining two seasons).

In the pilot episode of the Mel Brooks and Buck Henry television spy spoof Get Smart, Dunn showed his skill with comic farce as the well-heeled gangster Mr. Big, leader of international crime organization K.A.O.S. (September 18, 1965). Dunn featured as Alexander, a courageous court jester, in the Star Trek episode "Plato's Stepchildren" (November 22, 1968). He also appeared in an episode of Bonanza, "It's a Small World" (January 4, 1970), portraying a recently widowed circus performer trying to start a new life, and as a killer clown in the Voyage to the Bottom of the Sea episode "The Wax Men" (5 March 1967).

In 1963, he received the New York critics' Circle Award for best supporting actor and was nominated for a 1964 Tony Award, for his performance as Cousin Lymon in Edward Albee's stage adaptation of The Ballad of the Sad Café, by Carson McCullers. Dunn received an Oscar nomination and the Laurel Award as the best supporting actor for his role as the cynical Karl Glocken in Ship of Fools (Columbia Pictures, 1965, directed by Stanley Kramer).

In 1969, The New York Times drama critic Clive Barnes praised Dunn's portrayal of Antaeus in the tragedy The Inner Journey by British novelist and playwright James Hanley, performed at the Lincoln Center: "Michael Dunn as the dwarf is so good that the play may be worth seeing merely for him. Controlled, with his heart turned inward, his mind a pattern of pain, Mr. Dunn's Antaeus deserves all the praise it can be given."

Between those career highlights, he accepted roles in many pulp horror movies, as well as a role in the 1968 film No Way to Treat a Lady, starring Rod Steiger and George Segal. However, at the time of his death, he was in London playing Birgito in The Abdication (Warner Brothers, 1974, directed by Anthony Harvey), starring Peter Finch and Liv Ullmann. Author Günter Grass had already asked him to play in a film adaptation of his novel, The Tin Drum, a role that ultimately went to the young David Bennent after Dunn's death.

Personal life
Dunn was married on December 14, 1966, to Joy Talbot. Motion Picture Magazine described her as a model, in a photo caption in the March, 1967 issue. The marriage ended in divorce after a few years. He developed into a dedicated philanthropist toward children with dwarfism who would write fan letters to him confiding their loneliness and despair. According to Dorin, Dunn often traveled to visit such children at his own expense, delivering encouragement to them and stern counsel to overly protective parents.

His mobility and physical stamina were poor and deteriorated throughout his life. He had deformed hip joints (due either to hip dysplasia or coxa vara, with secondary osteoarthritis). However, he scampishly disguised his limitations by telling tall tales that a gullible press eagerly reported as the truth. Various accounts describe him as an aviator, skydiver, judo master, football player, and concert pianist, despite clear evidence on film of a severe, waddling limp, permanently flexed limbs, and gnarled fingers. In published interviews, he did hint at his childhood limitations both in football—"I was a great passer"—and in baseball: "I wasn't a very fast runner. I had to depend on sliding." 

Working in New York, eschewing public transportation, Dunn reportedly accrued masses of parking tickets, as disabled drivers had no special privileges. He received help from friend and stuntman Dean Selmier, who often carried Dunn on his shoulders through the streets of Manhattan.

Death
Spinal deformities, including scoliosis, caused a distorted ribcage that restricted Dunn's lung growth and function. The resulting respiratory insufficiency caused overload of the heart's right chambers, a chronic condition called cor pulmonale. He died in his sleep in his room at the Cadogan Hotel, Chelsea, London, on August 30, 1973, aged 38, while on location for The Abdication.

The New York Times reported his cause of death as undisclosed, leading to decades of repeated public speculation about possible suicide. However, the designation "undisclosed" signified merely that no cause of death had yet been determined.  An autopsy was performed on August 31, 1973, by Professor R.D. Teare at St. George's Hospital, London, who noted:  "The right side of the heart was widely dilated and hypertrophied to twice its normal thickness. The left ventricle was normal in size."  He recorded the cause of death as cor pulmonale. This information is confirmed in the "Report of the Death of an American Citizen" from the U.S. Department of State, Foreign Service, American Embassy in London, made out on October 12, 1973, by Micaela A. Cella, Vice Consul. The report is on record in the U.S. National Archives in College Park, Maryland.

A London physician reportedly prescribed and administered two narcotics and a barbiturate for severe arthritic pain, despite the extreme risk of inducing respiratory depression, apnea, and death in a patient with decreased respiratory reserve. Dunn may have needed the drugs in order to tolerate the physical demands of shooting a movie. The autopsy's finding of intense vascular congestion in the lungs also suggests the possibility that a rapidly progressive pneumonia may have been developing.

Allegations of chronic alcoholism are unsubstantiated by the autopsy report, which notes only venous congestion of the liver—presumably secondary to Dunn's right-heart failure—without cirrhosis, and without inflammation of the stomach lining or pancreas.  One consequence of such liver dysfunction would be jaundice.  Another would be intoxication after drinking even small amounts of alcohol, as well as a toxic reaction to the prescribed drugs—either of which could also induce altered mental status (such as disorientation, delusions, faulty memory).  This may explain the family's report that Dunn sent home a strange telegram "shortly before his death". ("I'm OK.  The cops are looking.") Rumors of foul play and theft of the body are unsubstantiated by Scotland Yard.

Despite being severely ill and in great pain, Dunn continued working nearly up to the day of his death, living up to his own description of himself as "a both-feet jumper". He was buried on September 10, 1973, in Lauderdale Memorial Park Cemetery, Fort Lauderdale, Florida, near his parents' retirement home in Lauderhill. In July 2007, a first cousin had his remains exhumed and driven to Oklahoma, re-interred near his parents' graves in Sunset Memorial Park Cemetery, Norman, Oklahoma.

TV and filmography

Source:  The Paley Center for Media, formerly The Museum of Television and Radio, 25 West 52nd Street, New York, NY 10019  (see below)

References

External links 

 Michael Dunn Actor and Singer
 
 

 Michael Dunn; @ Aveleyman.com
 Sculpture of Michael Dunn

1934 births
1973 deaths
People from Shattuck, Oklahoma
Male actors from Oklahoma
University of Michigan alumni
University of Miami alumni
Converts to Roman Catholicism from Anglicanism
Actors with dwarfism
American male television actors
American male stage actors
American male film actors
20th-century American male actors
Redford High School alumni